The causes of poverty may vary with respect to nation, region, and in comparison with other countries at the global level. Yet, there is a commonality amongst these causes. Philosophical perspectives, and especially historical perspectives, including some factors at a micro and macro level can be considered in understanding these causes. 

There are behavioral, structural and political theories on the causes of poverty: "Behavioral theories concentrate on individual behaviors as driven by incentives and culture. Structural theories emphasize the demographic and labor market context, which causes both behavior and poverty. Political theories contend that power and institutions cause policy, which causes poverty and moderates the relationship between behavior and poverty."

Absolute and relative poverty 
 Absolute poverty is a lack of basic necessities, based on a set income level. Per World Bank guidelines, people living on less than $2.15 a day are considered to be living in extreme poverty. This generally applies to people in low income countries. For lower middle-income countries, the delineation is $3.20 a day. For upper middle income nations, the delineation is $5.50 a day. These delineated standards account for differences in economies, since a poor household in a rich economic bloc is substantially more economically privileged than one in an economically deprived bloc. Thus, a discussion of poverty in an advanced economy has to take into account that absolute poverty might not be readily applicable to people in that economy.
 Relative poverty refers to individuals or entities that do not meet minimum standards versus others in the same area, place and time. A lot of poorer economies can have both absolute and relative poverty affecting its respective people. Relative poverty generally exists more in advanced economies.

Philosophical perspectives

Socialist perspective 
The socialist perspective attributes poverty to the ill-distribution of capital, wealth and resources that favor the interests of the "wealthy elite" or the "financial aristocracy" versus the community at large. The socialist tradition calls for the re-distribution of wealth as the solution to poverty. In essence, the" major levers of the economy" must be de-privatized and allocated to the working community-class that will adequately represent "the interests of ordinary people, rather than [those of] the wealthy elite." 

According to the Marxist theory, inequality (inherent in a class system) fosters poverty; both entities are generated from a "capitalist mode of production" with capitalism contributing to "inegalitarian social structures." Marxists believe the structural nature of society (which is the cause of poverty) has to be changed to remedy poverty in society. Conversely, critics to this perspective, like Milton Friedman postulated that under the socialist perspective, the suppression of individual rights and that of a free market economy can result in political absolutism and authoritarianism.

Neoliberal perspective 
The neoliberal perspective attributes poverty to centralization of free markets, sole government ownership of business enterprise and de-capitalization - a system in which capital, wealth and resources are at the sole discretion of government versus the individual. The perspective is dedicated to the idea that creating conditions for profitable private investment is the solution to poverty—since the private sector is better than government in running business and creating profit.

Neoliberal think tanks have received extensive funding,. According to the IMF, the measures of privatization, public spending cuts, and deregulation (the themes of Neoliberal ideology) have "increased inequality" and crippled economic prosperity in some regions of the world, especially in highly indebted countries.

Some causes, micro/macro levels

Micro level 
The International Food Study Institute had a brief on a collection of extensive studies that analyzed the causes of poverty, with analysis of household data and review of empirical findings in 20 countries. Some of the major causes of poverty, with historical perspective, were noted as follows:

 the inability of poor households to invest in property ownership.
 limited/poor education leading to fewer opportunities.
 limited access to credit, in some cases—creating more poverty via inherited poverty. 
 the systematic exclusion of ethnic minorities, ethnic castes, tribes, women and people with disabilities from participating in fair economic enterprise and access to institutions/markets. This exclusion generated a cycle and persistence of poverty.

Other Micro level causes 

 War, crime and violence are some primary causes of poverty noted. In 39 countries (since 2000), where political violence and organized crime historically thrived, the poverty level was twice that in countries with less reported war, crime and violence. 
 Unemployment - in half a dozen countries, where young people joined gangs and rebel groups (a factor leading to poverty), two thirds of the respondents (in a survey) reported that unemployment and slim opportunities were the main reasons in the promotion of poverty.

Macro level

Colonialism
Economists Daron Acemoglu and James A. Robinson maintain that poverty is associated with colonialism.  Likewise, economic anthropologist Jason Hickel and Dylan Sullivan posit that it was the expansion of colonialism and the bulldozing of regions into the emerging capitalist world system starting in the late 15th and early 16th centuries that created "periods of severe social and economic dislocation" which resulted in wages crashing to subsistence levels, rising mortality rates and the proliferation of famines. The effects of colonialism left behind institutions that were new, alien and unsustainable. The lack of continuity in these foreign institutions, left entirely in the untrained hands of the prior colonized populace, tended to generate poverty in the communities.

Climate change

Regionally
According to an article by Giovetti and McConville, climate change may cause poverty via the following, especially in highly indebted countries:
 limit agriculture and food sources - in poorer nations, limited agricultural produce/food threatens survival and strains resources, a catalyst for poverty.
 threaten education - changes in climate cause destruction of property (schools) and cause labor shifts that occur as children are removed from school. This roll over effect causes systemic poverty, since poor education equates to poorer economic opportunities.
 precipitate refugee migration - refugee migrations in search of food, water and safety tax environments with overcrowding, helps promote poor hygiene and gender based violence (an environment in which poverty thrives).
 threaten public health by creating less pure air, limited drinking water and poor sanitation, with poorer communities suffering more (an environment in which poverty thrives).

The World Bank affirms that, without much needed intervention, climate change could cause more than 100 million people, world-wide, to plunge into poverty by 2030. By 2050, regional areas like Latin America, South Asia and Sub-Saharan Africa could trigger migratory patterns potentially impacting over 143 million people.

Globally
While richer economies suffer less than poorer economies, richer economies are affected as well—through an increased burden of responsibility.

Causes of poverty - worldwide

Notable primary causes of poverty

Inadequate food and poor or limited access to clean water- relocation in search of food and clean water drains limited resources (especially in poor economies), causing the poor to get poorer as they seek basic necessities for survival. 
Inadequate, limited or poor access to healthcare - unhealthy people work less, are less productive and place demands on an already over-burdened healthcare system. This cycle causes affected people to stay poor. 
Unequal distribution of resources - disparities in the distribution of resources causes systemic poverty while those with more resources get wealthier and better access to services. 
Discrimination, inequality (racial/gender and other biases) - individuals treated less favorably because of any kind of discrimination, bias or prejudice get lesser access to opportunities to get out of poverty. 
Poor education - poorly educated individuals get limited opportunities to succeed in a dynamic work environment. Illiteracy fosters poverty. 
Climate change, damage to ecosystems and environmental degradation - floods, droughts and storms cause food/water shortages, aggravates basic survival and causes migrations that create a cycle of poverty. 
Poor governance, corruption, and poor infrastructure - keep the governed locked out of opportunities, wealth and resources, and denies them ready access to essential goods and services.
Conflict - particularly affects women in poorer economies. National or regional violence/unrest disrupts society and generates greater poverty in impacted areas.
Debt - on a micro level, as evidenced in advanced economies, causes poverty as more people without money/resources borrow more to either live within or outside their financial means. On a macro or national level (or even regional level), multilateral lending institutions create unfavorable conditions or terms of debt repayment to poorer economies, leading to greater burden of repayment that affects the masses.
Unemployment or little to no access to livelihoods - without money from employment, individuals and communities suffer poverty as a direct causation.
Concentration of land ownership - equates to unequal distribution of resources.
World hunger
Overpopulation- can tax limited resources and cause environmental degradation. Different schools of thought present varied perspectives.

Historical causes 

War
Conquest

Primary causes by country 
In alphabetical order

Algeria

Argentina

Australia

Bangladesh 
Bangladesh has made some strides in eradicating poverty through poverty reduction strategies (PRS). As a result of those strategies, some critical markers, indicative of poverty, show promise, viz. child mortality has decreased, gender parity is being promoted, micro-credit is practiced and a vibrant non-governmental sector is in place.

Notwithstanding, some notable causes of poverty Bangladesh is fighting against are: remnants of inequality, burdened healthcare costs, poor governance at multiple levels, inadequate sanitation and limited access to safe drinking water.

Canada 
Statistics Canada reported in 2013 that high-risk groups for poverty in Canada include "people with activity limitations (physical or mental disability), singles (unattached individuals), persons in lone-parent families, people with less than a high school education and minorities who are immigrants."

Activist group Canada Without Poverty, referencing Statistics Canada, identifies that 1 in 7 individuals or 4.9 million persons in the nation are experiencing poverty.

Chile

China
Though China is the second largest economy in the world and regarded as an upper-middle-income country, with a delineated poverty line of US$5.50 a day, about 373 million Chinese are believed to live below that stipulated poverty line.

The causes of poverty in China revolve around:

 "income inequality" with persistent "low paid labor" jobs 
 a rapidly aging labor force and a rising proportion of the rural poor 
 lack of a pension system for the rural elderly.
 economic stagnation—in which low cost, "low end" manufacturing has plateaued (and a "new growth model" is long overdue) 
 diminishing returns in investment vehicles 
 slowing in productivity  

The effects of pollution (with China being the biggest contributor to greenhouse gas emissions) contributes to global poverty through climate change and environmental degradation, especially in poorer economies. With the COVID-19 pandemic causing economic slowing of China's economy, anticipated redress appears to be futuristic for now.

Haiti 
Haiti, regarded as "the poorest country in the Western Hemisphere," has a GDP (per capita) of about US$797, as reported in 2019. Greater than 6 million Haitians reportedly live on less than US$2.41 per day, and more than 2.5 million on US$1.12 per day.

The causes of poverty in Haiti have been rooted in "institutional and political instability" that chronically suffocate the growth of its social and economic sectors.

Apart from the 2021 COVID-19 pandemic that has affected it (both politically and economically), particularly the poor and most vulnerable, Haiti has other natural elements such as hurricanes and earthquakes that have rendered some damage to its fragile infrastructure and limited economic resources. Deforestation has also exacerbated the effects of storms, floods and hurricanes.

Despite this depiction, the World Bank has committed financial resources (in the tune of over US$834.41 million—in October 2020) to resuscitate Haiti's economy. The International Finance Corporation (IFC) has also rendered support in re-vitalizing Haiti's economy in the areas of "energy, beverage [production], garment manufacturing, financial markets, and hospitality." Other resources from donors include over US$40 million for economic remedy in the aftermath of the COVID -19 pandemic.

Thus, overall, promising results are being observed in the sectors of education, health, better access to safe drinking water, energy production, agriculture and transport.

Indonesia

Iran

Japan

Mexico

Moldova 
Once part of the USSR, Moldova is regarded as the poorest country in Europe, with a reported "GDP per capita of $2,289." Despite that designation, Moldova has taken strides in reversing that designation. Between 2006 and 2015, the percentage of its people living below the national poverty line fell from over 30% to less than 10%.

Some cited reasons behind Moldova's poverty are:

 lack of ample large-scale industrialization.
 limited food supply.
 economic stagnation with poor transition to a dynamic economy (agricultural based to a technological based economy).
 aberrations in policy.
 increase in inequality, with the growing increase in urban and rural poverty.

Nigeria 
Nigeria is the most populated African nation with 42.54% of the population falling within the age group of 0 -14. Despite the population growth and its status as an OPEC member, Nigeria has 51% of the population living in extreme poverty, with some people living on as little as $1.90 a day.

Pakistan

Philippines 
From 1621 to 1901, food prices increased due to a change in the policies of commodity pricing which—in turn—increased the poverty rate. From 1960 to 2009, slow economic growth has contributed to the persistence of poverty and has also contributed to the non-poor becoming poor. Although poverty has been reduced overall, the inequality of poverty has increased, according to the Asian Development Bank.

Russia 
According to Russia's State Statistics Service (Rosstat), Russia's poverty statistics equaled 14.3%, or 20.9 million people versus 13.9%, or 20.4 million people, in the first three months of 2018.

The causes of poverty in Russia are complex: a shrinking economy, inflation, falling oil prices (due to Western sanctions) and in a rise in "consumer prices."  High transportation costs, including the cost of logistics, and the perception of inequality have hindered growth in investments, which, in turn, has generated a cycle of poverty.

Vladimir Putin is promoting a program that will tame the poverty stats by 2024.

South Africa 
Despite South Africa being ranked 38th in the "ranking of the richest countries with net financial assets per capita of $8,385 (R140,200),"  the causes of poverty in South Africa are multi-faceted. Major causes of poverty, precipitated by a history of apartheid, involve disparities in the distribution of resources, coupled with poor educational opportunities. Non-whites have also had poor access to job opportunities and health care—known catalysts in the generation and cycle of poverty. In response to these challenges, South Africa initiated the so-called Expanded Public Works Programme (EPWP) to participate in job creation and promoting equitable policies in employment practices. The government has also endeavored to improve schools, provide health care for the poor, children (ages 6 and below) and pregnant women.

United States 
The United States economy, complex and highly developed, is the largest global economy with the sixth highest per capita GDP (PPP) and about 20% of the total global output. The economy comprises dominant production sectors such as technology, financial services, healthcare, and retail. More than 20% of companies on the Fortune Global 500 originate from the United States.

The poverty rate in the United States, in 2019, was 10.5 percent, the reported lowest reported since 1959. The poverty rate varies across racial lines and was reported to have reached “historic lows in 2019.” For black Americans, the rate was about 18.8%; for white Americans (non-Hispanic), the rate was 7.3% and for Hispanics, it was 15.7%. For Asians, the rate was 7.3%, "the lowest on record."

Specifically, the poverty rate, in 2019, was most notable in the younger age category of 18 to 24 years old, of which 17.1% were males versus 21.35% females. Children were, as a group, most affected by poverty between the period, 1990 and 2018. Between 2000 and 2010, the poverty rate increased. A dip of 14.4% was later noted in 2019.  People of ages 65 to 74 had the lowest poverty rate.

The number of people living in relative poverty, across the country, tends to vary from state to state, e.g. in California (in 2018), 4.66 million people lived in poverty versus in Minnesota with about 456,000 people that lived in poverty.

The causes of relative poverty in the US are complex and revolve around the following:

 Societal inequity with associated disparities in pay, skills, opportunities and employment.
 Inequitable distribution of resources.
 Labor market issues – which adversely impact wages, skills and benefits.
 Limited access to educational opportunities – which impacts communities with low skilled labor. Adults without a high school diploma or college degree and/or marketable skills end up earning less.
 Intermingled social and demographic factors – which create unsustainable family structures and barriers, viz. single headed families with children and those with an unemployed head of household tend to gravitate towards less pay and higher rate of poverty.
 Policies and practices - that adversely impact health, food security and crime.

Trends

COVID-19 2020 
According to the World Bank, in 2015, approximately 734 million people, equating to 10 percent of the world's population, survived on less than $1.90 a day—versus 1.9 billion people in 1990 (equating to about 36 percent of the world's population).

The aforementioned progress made will be (and has been) reversed by the current global COVID-19 pandemic crisis, which is significantly affecting national, regional and global economies through unemployment, layoffs, poor delivery of essential goods and services as well as disruptions in the education and health sectors. One fact is clear: the effects of COVID-19 will impact the poor and poor economies to a disproportionately high degree, and causing more people to become poor.

In retrospect, countries, all over the world, injected vast monetary resources into social programs to mitigate the financial woes associated with the pandemic. 

Advanced economies utilized almost 28 percent of their GDP to keep their communities and others beyond them afloat. Similarly, middle income economies spent 7% of their GDP while developing economies spent 2% of their GDP for the upkeep of their own communities. These measures, ultimately, protected many families and communities from plunging into poverty. 

The full impact of COVID-19 on poverty, in countries world-wide, is expected to be fully discerned in a period of 12 to 24 months, from 2021. 
 
Projections reveal that the long-term effects of COVID-19 will likely expand poverty in countries with the following defining parameters: 

 Middle income economies
 Developing economies
 Conflict ridden regions with fragile governance

It is projected that by 2030, nine countries with an expanded segment of the "extreme poor" will be in Africa, with Burundi and North Korea tied together in tenth place. A number of middle-income economies will likely see an increased incidence of poverty in their nations as well. Notwithstanding, these projected trends are reversible with the creation of social programs that can be utilized to protect the most vulnerable in each community nation.

See also 
 Causes of income inequality
 Culture of poverty
 Cycle of poverty
 Involuntary unemployment
 Poverty reduction
 Theories of poverty

References

External links
  The factors causing poverty and suffering

Poverty
Poverty